Tenga (Keñi) is a rural locality (a selo) and the administrative centre of Tenginskoye Rural Settlement, Ongudaysky District, the Altai Republic, Russia. The population was 611 as of 2016. There are 7 streets.

Geography 
Tenga is located 40 km northwest of Onguday (the district's administrative centre) by road. Shiba and Kara Koby are the nearest rural localities.

References 

Rural localities in Ongudaysky District